"The Remarkable Rocket" is a short fairytale that was first published in 1888 in The Happy Prince and Other Tales which is a collection of five fairytales written by Oscar Wilde.

The Remarkable Rocket is a parody of aristocratic vanity and masculine conceit.
Although the story is written in simple language, the humour is directed at adults.

Plot summary 

A wealthy prince and a beautiful Russian princess, who are meant to marry, meet for the first time and fall madly in love with each other. Their wedding is to be a huge celebration for the entire realm, with all sorts of entertainment, including fireworks as a grand finale at midnight. The princess has never seen fireworks so the king, and the prince are eager for her to see them.  These fireworks, though, have the ability to speak and they talk amongst themselves before they are launched by the pyrotechnic.

Among the fireworks is a Rocket, who is arrogant, pompous and condescending. When he brags about his heritage, the others call him insensitive, and he takes great offense. To prove his sensitivity, the Remarkable Rocket bursts into tears before he is lit and is too damp to catch fire. The servants dispose of him over the castle walls and he lands in a ditch.

The Rocket doesn't realize that he has been discarded and believes that he is being given time to recover his strength before being lit. He still believes that he is superior, and speaks insultingly to a frog, a dragonfly, and a duck, boasting that he will be magnificent when he is finally let off.

Two boys who are collecting wood to make a fire mistake him for a piece of kindling. Much to his indignation, they place him on their fire. Eventually he dries off enough to ignite and explode. Alas, it is the middle of the day, and no one sees the display except a startled goose. Even as he fizzles away, the Remarkable Rocket still believes that he has created a great sensation.

Epigrams 

Wilde was known for his use of epigrams in his writing. These are brief, interesting, memorable, and sometimes surprising or satirical statements. The Remarkable Rocket contains many of these, including:

References

External links

Irish fairy tales
Irish folklore
Works by Oscar Wilde
1888 short stories
Literary parodies